Harold Clifford Keel (April 13, 1919November 7, 2004), known professionally as Howard Keel,  was an American actor and singer, known for his rich bass-baritone singing voice. He starred in a number of MGM musicals in the 1950s and in the CBS television series Dallas from 1981 to 1991.

Early life
Keel was born in Gillespie, Illinois, United States, to Navyman-turned-coalminer Homer Keel, and his wife, Grace Margaret (née Osterkamp). Keel was the younger of the couple's children, after elder son Frederick William Keel. The family was so poor that a teacher would often provide Keel with his lunch. 

After his father's death in 1930, Keel and his mother moved to California, where he graduated from Fallbrook High School at age 17. He worked various odd jobs until settling at Douglas Aircraft Company as a "traveling representative". He was a long haul truck driver.
 

In the 1950s, the MGM publicity department  stated that Keel's birth name was Harold Leek.

Career
At age 20, Keel was overheard singing by his landlady, Mom Rider, and was encouraged to take vocal lessons. One of his music heroes was the great baritone Lawrence Tibbett. Keel later remarked that learning that his own voice was a basso cantante was one of the greatest disappointments of his life. Nevertheless, his first public performance took place in the summer of 1941, when he played the role of Samuel the Prophet in Handel's oratorio Saul (singing a duet with bass-baritone George London).

In 1945, he briefly understudied for John Raitt in the Broadway hit Carousel before being assigned to Oklahoma! both written by Richard Rodgers and Oscar Hammerstein II. While performing in Oklahoma, Keel accomplished a feat that has never been duplicated on Broadway; he once performed the leads in both shows on the same day. In 1947, Oklahoma! became the first American postwar musical to travel to London, England, and Keel joined the production. On April 30, 1947, at the Drury Lane Theatre, the capacity audience (which included the future Queen Elizabeth II) demanded fourteen encores.

Keel made his film debut as Harold Keel at the British Lion studio in Elstree, in The Small Voice (1948), released in the United States as The Hideout. He played an escaped convict holding a playwright and his wife hostage in their English country cottage. Additional Broadway credits include Saratoga, No Strings, and Ambassador. He appeared at The Muny in St. Louis as Adam in Seven Brides for Seven Brothers (1978); Emile de Becque in South Pacific (1992); and as General Waverly in White Christmas (2000).

MGM

From London's West End, Keel went to Hollywood in 1949 where he was engaged by the Metro-Goldwyn-Mayer film studio. He made his musical film debut as Frank Butler in the film version of Irving Berlin's Annie Get Your Gun (1950), co-starring with Betty Hutton. The film was a big hit and established Keel as a star.

MGM put him opposite Esther Williams in Pagan Love Song (1950) which was successful, although not as profitable as most Esther William films because it went over budget. Keel had a third hit in a row with the comedy Three Guys Named Mike (1951), supporting Van Johnson and Jane Wyman.

Even more popular was Show Boat (1951), where Keel played the male lead opposite Kathryn Grayson and Ava Gardner. Keel was reunited with Williams in Texas Carnival (1952). He had his first flop at MGM with the comedy Callaway Went Thataway (1952) co-starring Fred MacMurray and Dorothy McGuire. A reunion with Grayson, Lovely to Look At (1952), based on the stage musical Roberta was popular but lost money.

MGM tried him in an adventure film, Desperate Search (1953) which was poorly received. So too was the comedy Fast Company (1953). More popular was a Western with Gardner and Robert Taylor, Ride, Vaquero! (1953).

Warner Bros borrowed Keel to play Wild Bill Hickok opposite Doris Day in Calamity Jane (1953), another hit. Back at MGM he and Grayson made a third musical together, Kiss Me Kate (1953), which again was liked by the public but unprofitable. The same went for Rose Marie (1954) which Keel made with Ann Blyth. However Seven Brides for Seven Brothers (1954) with Jane Powell was a huge success and made MGM over $3 million in profit.

Keel was one of many guest stars in Deep in My Heart (1954). He and Williams made a third film together, Jupiter's Darling (1955) which lost MGM over $2 million - the first Williams movie to lose money. Kismet (1955) with Blyth also lost over two million dollars, and Keel was released from his MGM contract.

Post-MGM
He returned to his first love, the stage. In 1957, he was in a short-lived revival of Carousel. Keel's next film was made in Britain, the thriller Floods of Fear (1959). He returned to Hollywood to play Simon-Peter in a Biblical epic, The Big Fisherman (1960). In 1959-60 he was in a short-lived Broadway musical Saratoga.  Keel went to Europe to make a low budget war film, Armored Command (1961). In England, he starred in The Day of the Triffids (1962).

As America's taste in entertainment changed, finding jobs became more difficult for Keel. The 1960s held limited prospects for career advancement and consisted primarily of nightclub work, B-Westerns and summer stock. He did Carousel in 1962 and 1966. He replaced Richard Kiley on Broadway in No Strings (1962). Keel starred in Westerns for A. C. Lyles, Waco (1966), Red Tomahawk (1966) and Arizona Bushwhackers (1968). He had a supporting part in a John Wayne Western, The War Wagon (1967).

In early 1970, Keel met Judy Magamoll, who was twenty-five years his junior and knew nothing about his stardom. Years later, Keel called the relationship love at first sight, but the age difference bothered him tremendously. For Judy, however, it was not a problem, and with the aid of Robert Frost's poem "What Fifty Said", she convinced him to proceed with their relationship. He resumed his routine of nightclub, cabaret and summer stock jobs with his new wife at his side.

From 1971 to 1972, Keel appeared briefly in the West End and Broadway productions of the musical Ambassador, which flopped.  In 1974, Keel became a father for the fourth time with the birth of his daughter, Leslie Grace. In January 1986, he underwent double heart bypass surgery.

Dallas
Keel continued to tour with his wife and daughter in tow, but by 1980 had decided to make his life change. He moved his family to Oklahoma with the intention of joining an oil company. The family had barely settled down when Keel was called back to California to appear with Jane Powell on an episode of The Love Boat. While there, he was told that the producers of the television series Dallas wanted to speak with him.

In 1981, after several guest appearances, Keel joined the show permanently as the dignified but hot-tempered oil baron Clayton Farlow. Starting with an appearance on the fourth season, the character had been meant as a semi-replacement patriarch for the series' Jock Ewing played by Jim Davis, who had recently died. However, Clayton was such a hit among viewers that he was made a series regular and stayed on until its end in 1991. Not only did Dallas revive his acting career, it breathed new life to his recording endeavors.

Recording career
With renewed fame, Keel commenced his first solo recording career, at age 64, as well as a successful concert career in the UK. He released an album in 1984, With Love, which sold poorly. However, his album And I Love You So reached #6 in the UK Albums Chart and #37 in Australia in 1984. The follow up album, Reminiscing – The Howard Keel Collection peaked at #20 in the UK Albums Chart, spending twelve weeks in that listing in 1985 and 1986. The album also peaked at #83 in Australia.

In 1988, the album Just for You reached #51 in the UK Albums Chart. In 1994, Keel and Judy moved to Palm Desert, California. The Keels were active in community charity events, and attended the annual Howard Keel Golf Classic at Mere Golf Club in Cheshire, England, which raised money for the National Society for the Prevention of Cruelty to Children (NSPCC). Keel attended the event for many years until 2004.

Honors
Keel received a star on the Hollywood Walk of Fame on 8 February 1960. It is located at 6253 Hollywood Boulevard.

A Golden Palm Star on the Palm Springs, California, Walk of Stars was dedicated to him in 1996.

Keel was a member of the Grand Order of Water Rats.

In 2019, he was inducted into the Western Performers Hall of Fame at the National Cowboy & Western Heritage Museum in Oklahoma City, Oklahoma.

Personal life and death
In 1943, Keel met and married actress Rosemary Cooper. They were divorced in 1948, during the London run of Oklahoma!. Keel met Helen Anderson, a member of the show's chorus, and they married in January 1949. Keel and Helen were separated in 1969 and divorced in 1970. Keel married airline flight attendant Judy Magamoll in December 1970. 

Keel had four children: three with second wife, Helen Anderson (two daughters, Kaija Liane and Kirstine Elizabeth; and a son, Gunnar Louis; one by his third wife of 34 years, Judy (a daughter, Leslie Grace); and ten grandchildren, including actor Bodie Olmos. 

Keel died at his Palm Desert home on November 7, 2004, six weeks after being diagnosed with colon cancer. He was cremated and his ashes scattered at three favourite places: Mere Golf Club, Cheshire, England; John Lennon Airport, Liverpool, England; and Tuscany, Italy.

Filmography

Film

Television

Stage work

 Oklahoma! (1945–46; 1947)
 Carousel (1946; 1957; 1962; 1966)
 South Pacific (1957; 1965; 1978; 1992)  
 Mister Roberts (1959)
 Saratoga (1959)
 Kismet (1962)
 No Strings (1962–63) 
 Show Boat (1963)
 Camelot (1964)
 Kiss Me, Kate (1964) 
 On a Clear Day You Can See Forever (1967) 
 The Fantasticks (1968) 
 The Unsinkable Molly Brown (1971–72; 1973) 
 Ambassador (1971–72) 
 The Most Happy Fella (1971)
 Man of La Mancha (1972) 
 Seven Brides for Seven Brothers (1978) 
 Paint Your Wagon (1979) 
 I Do! I Do! (1980)
 My Fair Lady (1996) 
 White Christmas (2000)

References

Sources
 Leiby, Bruce R. (2007). "Keel, (Clifford) Howard." The Scribner Encyclopedia of American Lives. Charles Scribner's Sons. Retrieved January 7, 2013, from HighBeam Research

External links

 
 
 
 Photographs and literature on Howard Keel

1919 births
2004 deaths
American bass-baritones
American male dancers
American male film actors
American male musical theatre actors
American male soap opera actors
American male television actors
American male pop singers
American Methodists
Deaths from cancer in California
Deaths from colorectal cancer
Male actors from Illinois
Male actors from San Diego
American male Shakespearean actors
American male stage actors
Metro-Goldwyn-Mayer contract players
Singers from Illinois
Singers from California
People from Gillespie, Illinois
People from Palm Desert, California
Presidents of the Screen Actors Guild
20th-century American male actors
20th-century American male singers
20th-century American singers